Events in the year 1954 in Portugal.

Incumbents
President: Francisco Craveiro Lopes 
Prime Minister: António de Oliveira Salazar

Events
 22 July – 11 August - Indian annexation of Dadra and Nagar Haveli

Sport
In association football, for the first-tier league seasons, see 1953–54 Primeira Divisão and 1954–55 Primeira Divisão; for the Taça de Portugal seasons, see 1953–54 Taça de Portugal and 1954–55 Taça de Portugal. 
 4 April - Establishment of F.C. Maia
 27 June - Taça de Portugal Final
 1 December - Opening of the Estádio da Luz, in Lisbon
 Star World Championships, in Cascais
 Opening of the Pavilhão Rosa Mota, in Porto
 Establishment of CA Macedo de Cavaleiros

Births
 9 February - Ana Gomes, diplomat and politician
 21 March - Adelino Teixeira, former professional road cyclist
 10 October - Fernando Santos, football manager, former footballer

References

 
Portugal
Years of the 20th century in Portugal
Portugal